Hackworth Park (alternately the Recreation Ground) is a park in Shildon, County Durham, England. It was named after Timothy Hackworth, a railway pioneer from the town.

History

The park was opened on Saturday 28 September 1912. To celebrate the opening there was a procession which included horses, cyclists, the fire brigade, miners lodges and two brass bands. On 30 August 1913 the bandstand was opened. There are two drinking fountains in the park; the first was given by the committee of the old Shildon Working Men's Club and has an ornate canopy with a centre column and herons surrounding the drinking tube. The second is octagonal, it has 8 roundels between dragon's heads depicting a railway locomotive designed by Timothy Hackworth and is Grade II listed with Historic England. The park was named after Timothy Hackworth, a railway pioneer who came from Shildon, there is a statue of him in the park, the original statue was vandalised and moved to the nearby National Railway Museum Shildon with a modern replacement put in its place. The Surtees Rail Trail passes through the park, it is now a footpath that follows the former Surtees Railway Branch Line, which was a private railway created by the Surtees family to link their collieries to the main line.

Facilities
Shildon Town Council and Shildon Civic Hall are at the park. There are also playing fields, tennis courts and football pitches.

References

Parks and open spaces in County Durham
Shildon